There are several places in the US state of Wisconsin named Klondike:
Klondike, Kenosha County, Wisconsin, an unincorporated community
Klondike, Oconto County, Wisconsin, an unincorporated community